Indrit Shaban Fortuzi (born 23 November 1973) is an Albanian retired national football forward who has played almost all his career for Tirana.

Club career
Nicknamed Zogu (bird), he has also played for Dinamo Tirana and in Greece for Iraklis and Apollon Athens. He is the best scorer of all time for Tirana and the third scorer of all time for Albanian Superliga with 167 goals.

International career
One of the biggest talents to emerge from Albanian football in the 1990s, Fortuzi made his debut for Albania in June 1992 FIFA World Cup qualification match against Lithuania in Tirana and earned a total of 25 caps, scoring 1 goal. His final international was an April 2002 friendly loss at Andorra.

Personal life
He is married to Junida Hoxha, and together they have two children, named Ketlin(Catlyn) and Rajan(Ryan). Fortuzi went in politics and was mayor of one of Tirana's municipalities in 2012.

Fortuzi and his wife suddenly left Albania in 2015, reportedly after losing large sums of money in gambling and/or because of alleged fraud with airline tickets committed by his wife. In May 2017, Junida was in absentia sentenced to 3,5 years in prison for the fraud with her Just Travel agency.

They later resurfaced in Canada, where Fortuzi is currently working as a coach for the ProStars Football Club in Brampton, Ontario.

Honours

KF Tirana
 Albanian Superliga:(5) 1994-95, 1995-96, 1996-97, 2002–03, 2003–04 
Albanian Supercup:(4) 1994, 2000, 2002, 2003
Albanian Cup:(4) 1993-94, 1995-96, 2000-01, 2001-02

Statistics

Clubs

International

References

External links

1973 births
Living people
Footballers from Tirana
Albanian footballers
Association football midfielders
Albania international footballers
Kategoria Superiore players
Super League Greece players
FK Dinamo Tirana players
KF Tirana players
Apollon Smyrnis F.C. players
Iraklis Thessaloniki F.C. players
Albanian expatriate footballers
Expatriate footballers in Greece
Albanian football managers
KF Skënderbeu Korçë managers
Albanian expatriate sportspeople in Canada